Claire Jean Kim (born July 27, 1965) is an American political scientist at the University of California, Irvine.

She received her A.B. from Harvard College and an M. Phil and Ph.D. from Yale University. Her research interests are comparative race studies, human-animal studies, race and politics, and social movements.

Selected publications 
 Bitter Fruit: The Politics of Black-Korean Conflict in New York City (Yale University Press, 2000) 
 Species/Race/Sex (a special issue of American Quarterly, 65, 3, September 2013, co-edited with Carla Freccero) 
 Dangerous Crossings: Race, Species and Nature in a Multicultural Age (Cambridge University Press, 2015)

Grants and awards  
 American Political Science Association's Ralph Bunche Award for the Best Book on Ethnic and Cultural Pluralism
 Best Book Award from the American Political Science Association Organized Section on Race, Ethnicity, and Politics 
 Grant from the University of California Center for New Racial Studies
 Fellowship at the Institute for Advanced Study in Princeton, New Jersey 
 Fellowship at the University of California Humanities Research Institute

References 

American women political scientists
American political scientists
University of California, Irvine faculty
Harvard College alumni
Yale University alumni
Critical race theory
Educators from Greater Los Angeles
Living people
1965 births
American women non-fiction writers